Robert of Normandy may refer to:

 Rollo, baptized as Robert, (c. 860 - c. 932), viking founder and first ruler of Normandy
 Robert the Magnificent (1000 – 1035), also called the Devil or Robert I, Duke of Normandy, son of Richard II, Duke of Normandy
 Robert Curthose or Robert II (c. 1051 or 1054–1134), Duke of Normandy, son of William the Conqueror, the first Norman king of England